The United Arab Emirates has universal healthcare, with healthcare provided for all nationals and mandatory health insurance for citizens of other countries. Employers are required to provide health insurance for expatriate workers. In the UAE employers must also provide health insurance for up to one spouse and three dependents, while in Dubai expats are required to provide insurance for their dependents.

Standards of health care are considered to be generally high in the United Arab Emirates, resulting from increased government spending during strong economic years. According to the UAE government, total expenditures on health care from 1996 to 2003 were AED 1,601,384,360.05 [US$436 million]. According to the World Health Organization, in 2004 total expenditures on health care constituted 2.9 percent of gross domestic product (GDP), and the per capita expenditure for health care was US$497. Healthcare currently is free only for UAE citizens.

The World bank ranked Dubai and Abu Dhabi as being the 2nd and 3rd, respectively,  most popular medical tourism destinations in the region, behind Jordan. In first half of 2015, Dubai had attracted 260,000 medical tourists.

Origins of health care in the UAE
The start of modern health care in the United Arab Emirates can be traced to the days when the area was known as the Trucial States. In 1943, a small healthcare centre was opened in the Al Ras area of Dubai. In 1951, under the patronage of Sheikh Saeed bin Maktoum, the Ruler of Dubai, the first phase of the Al Maktoum Hospital was built and continued over succeeding years until a 157-bed hospital was completed. In 1960, Sheikhs Shakhbut and Zayed of Abu Dhabi visited an American mission in Muscat and were so impressed by what they saw that they invited the couple in charge, Pat and Marian Kennedy, to open a clinic in Al Ain, which they did in the November of that year.  This became officially known as the Oasis Hospital, unofficially as the “Kennedy Hospital” to local people. In 1966, a small outpatient department opened in Abu Dhabi, followed a year later by the appointment of Dr Philip Horniblow with a brief to develop a national health service. This led the then ruler of Abu Dhabi, Sheikh Zayed, to open a new hospital, the Central Hospital, in 1968.

Health care systems
The UAE now has 40 public Hospitals, compared with only 7 in 1970. The Ministry of Health is undertaking a multimillion-dollar program to expand health facilities and hospitals, medical centres, and a trauma centre in the seven emirates. A state-of-the-art general hospital has opened in Abu Dhabi with a projected bed capacity of 143, a trauma unit, and the first home health care program in the UAE. To attract wealthy UAE nationals and expatriates who traditionally have travelled abroad for serious medical care, Dubai is developing Dubai Healthcare City, a hospital free zone that will offer international-standard advanced private healthcare and provide an academic medical training centre; completion is done and finished on 2010. 12 million people visit Dubai every year for healthcare services.

Electronic health records

Abu Dhabi is leading the way in using national Electronic health record data as a live longitudinal cohort in the assessment of risk of cardiovascular disease.

Emirate of Abu Dhabi
Effective January 2006, all residents of Abu Dhabi are covered by a new comprehensive health insurance program ; costs will be shared between employers and employees.
Prior to 2007, government owned health care facilities were managed by the General Authority for Health Services, GAHS. In 2007, this authority was restructured into:
Health Authority – Abu Dhabi which is responsible for regulating the healthcare industry and developing Abu Dhabi's health policy.
Abu Dhabi health Services Company, SEHA is responsible for managing government-owned healthcare facilities in Abu Dhabi. Currently, SEHA manages 57 Primary Health Care Centers, 13 Hospitals, 3 Maternal and Child Health Centers, 3 Specialized Dental Centers, one centre for Autism, and 5 Specialised Facilities like rehab, blood bank and herbal center.

Emirate of Dubai

 Dubai Health Authority (DHA): for public and private healthcare facilities in the Emirate of Dubai
 Dubai Healthcare City (DHCC): for private healthcare facilities with Dubai Healthcare City.
 Ministry of Health (United Arab Emirates) (MOH): for public and private healthcare facilities in the Emirates of Sharjah, Ajman and the rest of the north Emirates, also few public facilities in Dubai like Al Baraha Hospital and Al Amal Psychiatric Hospital.
Surveys are conducted under the supervision of Dubai Health Authority (DHA) which is empowered to set and implement the policies and strategies for health.

A survey initiated in 2012 by DHA with the intention of surveying all healthcare facilities in Dubai in order to set up Dubai Clinical Services Capacity Plan 2020 (DCSCP). From September 2 to October 25, 2012, the Emirate's first comprehensive survey of health care services was carried. The purpose of the study was to identify the gaps in Dubai healthcare market and in planning future health care services in Dubai.

See also
 Health in the United Arab Emirates

References